Cornelia Hubertina "Neel" Doff (Buggenum, Netherlands, 27 January 1858 – Ixelles, Belgium, 14 July 1942) was an author of Dutch origin living and working in Belgium and mainly writing in French. She is one of the most important contributors to proletarian literature.

Biography

Third born to a family of nine, Cornelia accompanied her family on its perennial successive moves (Amsterdam, Antwerp, Brussels) facing a progressively worsening poverty. Determined to fight her way from underneath the rag and tether class she started modeling for a large number of renowned Belgian painters (James Ensor, Félicien Rops) and to a lesser extent sculptors (Charles Samuel, Paul de Vigne). She posed as Charles de Coster's character Nele by Charles Samuel (Monument Charles de Coster, Charles de Coster Monument Place Flagey Ixelles) and for Paul de Vigne, The Little Dutch Girl (Royal Museums of Fine Arts of Belgium), and highly probably for the identical Metdepenningen (Ghent cemetery and Ben Cable Monuments Ben Cable Monument Chippiannock Cemetery, Rock Island in Illinois).
In these artistic circles she met Fernand Brouez (1860–1900) whom she eventually married. Son of Jules Brouez, a rich notary and Victorine Sapin, Fernand Brouez financed and edited La Société Nouvelle, at that time considered the most valuable socialist economical magazine in the French language.

After Brouez's death she married Georges Serigiers, a prominent lawyer from Antwerp and family friend of the Brouez family. Years later, when looking at a cluster of youngsters through the window of the Serigiers stately home in Antwerp, the hurtful memories of her past came to life. She poured her heart and soul in her first book Jours de Famine et de Détresse (Days of Hunger and Distress). In picture like stories she tells the tale of a young girl, Keetje Oldema exposed to scorn and humiliation because of her hopeless misery, eventually forced into prostitution by her mother to feed her little brothers and sisters. Laurent Tailhade became her greatest fan and, fascinated by this journey of annihilated youth, defended her work at the 1911 Prix Goncourt. She lost the prize by one vote, but remained nevertheless very impressed with the honour of being nominated.

With Keetje and Keetje Trottin, Neel Doff finalised her autobiographical trilogy. She rounded the Doff saga off with various stories about her siblings in other works. In 1907 the Serigiers moved into their splendid new summer residence in Genk. Inspired by the villagers, one family in particular, Neel Doff puts her pen to paper. Tallying her work and enjoying her life as 'Grande Dame' within a selected social circle, she published many short stories in various magazines and periodicals. She also translated three works from Dutch into French.

In December 1929 the following quote by Thibaud-Gersen appeared in Le Courier Littéraire: "When will they award the Nobel Prize to the humble and genial Neel Doff"? These words were enough to spread rumours and speculation about the 1930 Nobel Prize awards. Unfortunately the myth that Neel Doff was nominated persists in various publications. (See "Neel Doff par elle même"; ; p. 21 and in the German translation published under the title Keetje Tippel from the Dutch text of Jours de Famine et de Détresse p. 5 introduction by Dr. Josh van Soer).

Many compared her work to that of Émile Zola. In her own words in reference to Émile Zola: "He wrote about it while I lived it". Also called "The Dostojevski of the North", the character of Keetje parallels that of Sonja in Crime and Punishment. Henry Poulaille, who became her editor after the death of her husband Georges Serigiers, praises her as surpassing Colette. Neel Doff's somewhat brutish writing style on proletarian issues remains however controversial. She was an autodidact and wrote as she saw and felt.  Emile Verhaeren commented on Days of Hunger and Distress that it needed "galvanising". In 1930 Belgium paid tribute to her contribution to French Literature by appointing her Officer of the Order of the Crown (Belgium), one of Belgium's most prestigious awards.

On 14 July 1942, Neel Doff, embittered by the horrors of the war and suffering from kidney failure, died in her house, 16 rue de Naples in Ixelles. In order to secure her estate she only left the author rights of her work to her dear friend Mrs. Helen Temersen, who being Jewish saw her welfare and worldly belongings in peril. Helen Temersen sold the author rights in the early 1970s to the publisher Meulenhoff in Amsterdam. The house in Ixelles was bequeathed to the children of Franz Hellens, author and librarian, who took up residence at the house and wrote there as well. The remainder of her estate went to various individuals. Several art effects, including a James Ensor, mysteriously disappeared from the Ixelles residence and are yet to be found.

Bibliography

Works
Jours de Famine et de Détresse.  (Days of Hunger and Distress) - Multiple publications in Paris and Brussels throughout the decades.
Translated in Dutch:
Dagen van Honger en Ellende. Trans. Anna van Gogh-Kaulbach, 1915.
Dagen van Honger en Ellende. Trans. Wim Zaal. Amsterdam: Meulenhoff, 1970 and 1971.
Portuguese:
Dias de Fome e de Angùstia. Trans. Amélia Pato. Lisboa: Ediçào Liber, 1975.
Russian:
1925 and 1926: no data available.
German:
under the title Keetje Tippel. Translated from Wim Zaal's Dutch translation. Trans. Hanna Mittelstäd. Preface by Dr. Josh van Soer:  Nautilus/Nemo Press, 1982.
Swedish:
Dagar av svält och förtvivlan in: Keetje x 3 / Neel Doff ; översättning och inledning: Ann-Mari Gunnesson. Visby : Nomen : 2012
Contes Farouches. (Bitter Tales) Paris: Ollendorf, 1913. Basac: Plein Chant, 1981. (One tale: 'Lyse d’Adelmond' a fictional story was omitted in this publication)
Translated in Spanish:
under the title of the first story "Stientje". Trans. J. Garcia Mercadal. Madrid: Collecciön Babel, 1921.
Dutch:
under the title De Avond dat Mina me meenam. Trans. Wim Zaal. Amsterdam: Meulenhoff, 1974. Selected from tales out of Contes farouches, Angelinette (Young Angela) and Une fourmi ouvrière (The Work Ant).
Russian:
1925 and 1926: no data available.
Keetje.  (Keetje) - Several publications in Paris and Brussels.
Translated in Dutch:
Two publications under the title Keetje Tippel. Trans. Wim Zaal.
Spanish:
under the title Historia triste de una mujer alegre (Keetje) Trans. J. Garcia Mercadal, 1923
English:
Keetje. Trans. Frederick Whyte , no reference to Sir Alexander Frederick Whyte. London: Hutchinson, 1930.
Russian:
Тяжким путем (Keetje) ("By the hard path"). Leningrad (St. Petersburg): Seyatel, 1925. 
Женщина с улицы ("Woman of the street"). Munich: Rodina, 1947. 
Swedish:
Keetje in: Keetje x 3 / Neel Doff ; översättning och inledning: Ann-Mari Gunnesson. Visby : Nomen : 2012
Keetje Trottin. (Keetje The Errand Girl) - one publication in Paris and one in Brussels.
Swedish:
Springflickan in: Keetje x 3 / Neel Doff ; översättning och inledning: Ann-Mari Gunnesson. Visby : Nomen : 2012
Angelinette. (Young Angela) Paris: Crès, 1923.
Campine. (Campine) Paris: Rieder, 1926.
Elva, suivi de Dans nos bruyères. (Elva, followed by In our Heather Fields), Paris: Rieder, 1929.
Translated in Dutch: In our Heather Fields under the title Bittere Armoede in de Kempen. Trans. R. de Jong-Belinfante: Amsterdam; Meulenhoff, 1983, includes the translation of Je voulais en faire un homme (I Wanted To Turn Him into A Man).
Une Fourmi Ouvrière. (The Work Ant) Paris: Au Sans Pareil, 1935.
Quitter Tout Cela! suivi de Au Jour le Jour. (Leaving All This! followed by From Day To Day) Paris-Nemours: Ed. Entre Nous, 1937.
Translated in Dutch: Afscheid, gevolgd door Van Dag tot Dag. Trans. R. de Jong-Belinfante. Amsterdam, 1975.

Film
 Keetje Tippel, a 1975 film by Paul Verhoeven depicting Doff's life.  Distributed in English as Katie's Passion.

Translations made by Neel Doff from Dutch
L’Enfant Jésus en Flandre. (The Child Jesus in Flandres). (Felix Timmermans: Het Kindeke Jesus in Vlaanderen) Paris: Rieder 1925.
La Maisonnette près du Fossé. (The Little House near the Ditch). (Carry van Bruggen: Het Huisje aan de Sloot) Paris: Ed. Du Tambourin, 1931. Paris: Lire; Roman inédité et complet, 1931.
De Vieilles Gens. (About Old Folks and the things that pass ...). (Louis Couperus: Van oude menschen, de dingen, die voorbij gaan...). Lost unpublished manuscript.
Many short stories and other writings by Neel Doff were published in various periodicals. These texts were cited in various references: i.e. two of the three biographies written about Neel Doff. In 1975, Dutch filmmaker, Paul Verhoeven created the movie Katie Tippel. The movie holds elements of the trilogy, 'Days of Hunger and Distress'; 'Keetje' and 'Keetje The Errand Girl'. Some of these publications were only very recently discovered and that no record of some of them, the Spanish, English and Russian translations were found in either of Neel Doff's residences.

References
Neel Doff par elle-même: . Bruxelles: Ed. Esseo, 1964.  - This book compels a cluster of extracts of Neel Doff's work.
Neel Doff: Évelyne Wilwerth. Belgique: Pré aux Sources; Éditions Bernard Gilson, 1992. Researched and documented work.
Translated in: Dutch; Neel Doff de biografie; Guy Vandeputte; A. Manteau nv,1992. English; Neel Doff (1858-1942) A biography Renée Linkhorn; Belgian Francophone Library; Volume 8; Peter Lang, Publishing, Inc., New-York; 1997.
Neel Doff, leven na Keetje Tippel: written in Dutch; Eric Defoort; Uitgeverij Hadewijch 1993.
Villa Keetje Tippel: written in Dutch; Stefan Brijs. Account of the dynamics behind Neel Doff's work and her surroundings in the Genk area and its population.
Thesis by Ann-Mari Gunnesson: Les écrivains flamands et le champ littéraire en Belgique francophone. Thèse pour le doctorat. Göteborg, Acta Universitatis Gothoburgensis, [2000] 2001. (Romanica Gothoburgensia 48) Flemish Writers and the Literary Field in Francophone Belgium; doctoral thesis; University of Göteborg [2000] 2001.
Ann-Mari Gunnesson, Nästan. Neel Doff och den självbiografiska fällan. Visby: Books on Demand, 2009. Biography on Neel Doff written in Swedish. Abstract in English (Almost. Neel Doff and the autobiographical trap). Résumé en français (À peu près. Neel Doff et le piège autobiographique).
Encyclopædia Britannica.
Fabrice Wilvers : La Société Nouvelle et L'Humanité Nouvelle, deux revues cosmopolites et pluralistes. Mémoire de Licence en Sciences du Livre et des Bibliothèques, Faculté de Philosophie et Lettres, Section Infodoc, année académique 2001–2002, Université Libre de Bruxelles.

Homage
Franz Hellens: Le Disque Vert

References

Writers from Amsterdam
1858 births
1942 deaths
Dutch writers
Officers of the Order of the Crown (Belgium)
Belgian writers in French
Burials at Ixelles Cemetery
20th-century Belgian writers
20th-century Belgian women writers
French-language writers from the Netherlands